The Happy Elf is a 2005 computer-animated Christmas television special based on Harry Connick, Jr.’s song of the same name. The special is narrated by Connick and stars the voices of Rob Paulsen, Carol Kane, Lewis Black, Kevin Michael Richardson and Mickey Rooney. The animation was provided by Film Roman, an IDT Entertainment company, known for animating The Simpsons. The Happy Elf originally aired on NBC on December 2, 2005.

Plot

Eubie the Elf (Rob Paulsen) loves working in Santa's workshop up at the North Pole, despite the other elves' complaints about being annoyed by his overly happy personality. One Christmas Eve morning, Eubie's boss, Norbert, assigns him to checking the naughty and nice lists. However, while checking the lists, Eubie discovers that every child in the town of Bluesville is naughty. So, he decides to go to Bluesville and spread Christmas cheer.

Bluesville is a dark miserable town at the bottom of a very deep valley, completely surrounded by tall dark cliffs. There, the townspeople feel the warmth of the sun only once a day. They never smile, they don't know how to tell a joke properly, most of them work at the What Factory, where all the world's question marks are made, and at the Bluesville school, recess only lasts one minute. Eubie tries to brighten everyone's spirits, but his overly good mood frightens them.

Eubie talks to the mayor about what is wrong with Bluesville and if there's anything about Bluesville that makes him feel proud. The mayor replies that Bluesville is the world's largest manufacturer of un-burnable coal, which children enjoy throwing at people and at each other. The mayor then makes a deal with Eubie. If he can find another use for the coal, he'll put a Christmas tree up in the town square.

Eubie's first plan on getting the kids to help him make Bluesville a happier place is having them gather on a busy street and start a pie fight, but that only makes all the people angry. To search for more help, Molly (Mae Whitman), a naughty 10-year-old girl, takes Eubie to downtown Bluesville, the most miserable part of Bluesville, for a meeting of a group called S.L.O.B. (Smile League Of Bluesville), which only has one member of its group. While there, Molly and Eubie meets up with Curtis (Candi Milo), who is there because he brought along his foreign friend, Oreg, who doesn't speak English, but is happy to be there. Molly soon decides that Eubie's plans are hopeless, and tells him to just take all his big ideas home. At the mention of that, Eubie gets another idea, and is about to implement it when the lights in the room go off and Eubie is taken back to the North Pole.

In his bid to get Bluesville off the naughty list, Eubie violated several rules in one day. As punishment, Santa had Eubie turn in his magic hat, which, at the North Pole, meant his Christmas happiness and powers were taken away. When Gilda (Carol Kane) hears this, she motivates Eubie to go back to Bluesville to finish his job and gives him her hat to restore his powers and happiness. He then returns to Bluesville and explains his plan to the children. That night, they give the mayor of Bluesville a bottle of anti-snore medicine in his sleep, while Eubie spends the night polishing all the cliffs surrounding Bluesville with a jar of super-duper un-burnable coal polish. While he is doing this, Derek notices Gilda doesn't have her hat on, he soon figures out what is going on and, trying to follow the North Pole rules, he notifies one of the higher-ups.

After polishing the cliffs, Eubie is taken back to the North Pole again where he and Gilda are put on punishment and are sentenced to clean up the toy factory, with both their hats taken away. Derek, now alone at the Christmas party, is sad and mad with himself for betraying his friends, and confesses to what he did to Eubie and Gilda. They forgive him, but it only makes him feel worse about himself, considering what he did to them. While wondering what he can do to make it up to them, they have him do the one thing Eubie intended to do to finish making Bluesville a happier place.

When the sun shines over Bluesville again, it reflects off the polished coal, lighting up the town and making everyone happy. At the What Factory, the machine now makes different colored exclamation points of all shapes and sizes, delighting the workers. At the school, when recess starts, the bell has an elf's shoe placed over it, which means the kids can play longer. Molly comes out of the school where Derek meets her. He tells her to find the mayor and give her the jar of coal polish Eubie used to polish the cliffs, and a piece of coal that was squeezed into a diamond and to tell her that Eubie was sorry he couldn't be there. Molly happily goes to find the mayor, but stays for a while to allow Curtis to tell a joke that's actually funny, thanks to the joke book Derek gave him. Molly finds the mayor and shows him the items, which meant that there was indeed another use for the coal. He then puts up a Christmas tree in the town square and everybody celebrates, thanks to Eubie.

That Christmas, Santa decides to make Eubie, Gilda, and Derek his sleigh crew that year for bringing joy to Bluesville, which has soon changed its name to Joyville.

Cast
 Rob Paulsen as Eubie
 Harry Connick Jr. as Lil' Farley
 Carol Kane as Gilda
 Mickey Rooney as Santa Claus
 Kevin Michael Richardson as Derek, Tucker, Mayor, Toady
 Mae Whitman as Molly
 Lewis Black as Norbert
 Candi Milo as Curtis
 Rory Thost and Liliana Mumy as Brother and Sister

Soundtrack
Some DVDs come with a free soundtrack
 "The Happy Elf" - 03:43 - vocal track, sung by Harry Connick, Jr.
 "Smile on Christmas Day" - 01:00 - vocal track, sung by Rob Paulsen
 "Bluesville" - 01:34 - vocal track, sung by Kevin Michael Richardson
 "Lil' Farley's 'Happy Elf'" - 00:22
 "Old Santa Claus" - 02:25
 "Eubie and Friends Pole Adventure" - 00:43
 "Gingerbread House Test" - 00:46
 "Eubie's Toy Car Test" - 00:36
 "Coffee Shop Theme" - 00:56
 "Department of Naughty and Nice" - 01:18
 "Norbert's Orders" - 00:33
 "Eubie's Naughty & Nice Tally" - 02:15
 "Eubie Lands in Bluesville" - 00:59
 "Bluesville Street Theme" - 01:31
 "Molly and Friends Coal Toss" - 02:09
 "Down Town Theme" - 01:05
 "S.L.O.B. Meeting" - 01:27
 "'Try'" - 01:33
 "Molly and Gang's Christmas Mission" - 02:40
 "Santa's Elves Wrap Party" - 00:38
 "Santa Getting Ready for Xmas" - 00:26
 "Mayor Gives the Town a Tree" - 01:03
 "'Bluesville' Reprise" - 01:21
 "Lil' Farley's 'Happy Elf' Reprise" - 01:05
 "'Happy Elf' Wrap" - 00:19

The official reference recording for the live theatrical show was recorded in Scranton, PA in partnership with the Scranton Cultural Center at the Masonic Temple in 2013.

Stage adaptation
The holiday special has been adapted into a full-length stage musical. Andrew Fishman has reworked the book, with music and lyrics by Connick who has added five new songs for the musical, for example "That Magic Hat". The show premiered at Coterie Theatre at Crown Center in Kansas City, Missouri on November 13, 2007 to generally good reviews. It is received a fully produced workshop at the Adventure Theatre, at the Robert E. Parilla Performing Arts Center at Montgomery College, Rockville, Maryland, from November 12, 2010 through November 28, with a cast that features Michael Rupert.
In 2012 The Happy Elf was reworked by Connick and on December 1, 2012 premiered in a version prepared for publication in Bethlehem, PA at the Charles Brown Ice House under the direction of Michael Melcher, Executive Director.

The Scranton Cultural Center at the Masonic Temple, in Scranton, Pennsylvania produced and premiered the final illustrative staging of the musical on December 19, 2014 for a two-week run prior to its publication.

References

http://articles.mcall.com/2012-11-30/entertainment/mc-harry-connick-pennsylvania-youth-theater-bethle-20121129_1_happy-elf-harry-connick-cool-idea

External links
 
 
 http://articles.mcall.com/2012-11-30/entertainment/mc-harry-connick-pennsylvania-youth-theater-bethle-20121129_1_happy-elf-harry-connick-cool-idea
 http://www.scrantonculturalcenter.org/happyelf/

Harry Connick Jr.
2005 television films
2005 films
2005 television specials
2000s American television specials
2000s animated television specials
Christmas television specials
American children's animated musical films
Santa Claus in film
Films based on songs
Santa Claus in television
American computer-animated films
Film Roman films
NBC television specials
American Christmas television specials
Television shows set in the Arctic
Elves in popular culture
2000s American films